The following is a list of the CHUM Chart number-one singles of 1957.

See also
1957 in music

References

1957
Canada Chum
1957 in Canadian music